Done may refer to:

Places
 Done, Maharashtra, a village in India

People with the name 
 Done P. Dabale (1949–2006), Nigerian philanthropist, theologian, farmer, nurse, educator and author
 Cheryl Done (born 1970), British bobsledder
 Cyril Done (1920–1993), English footballer
 Frances Done (born 1950), British public administrator, accountant and politician
 Fred Done (born 1943), English businessman
 Jason Done (born 1973), English actor
 John Done (c. 1747–1831), Justice of the Maryland Court of Appeals
 Ken Done (born 1940), Australian artist
 Matt Done (born 1988), English footballer
 Peter Done (born 1947), English businessman
 Richard Done (born 1955), Australian cricketer
 Robert Done (1904–1982), English footballer
 William Done (1815–1895), English organist

Music
 Done (18th Dye album), 1994
 Done (Straitjacket Fits album), 1992
 "Done" (The Band Perry song), 2013
 Done (Chris Janson song), 2019
 "Done", a 2011 song by The Haunted  from the album Unseen

Other uses
 DONE (Data-based Online Nonlinear Extremumseeker), an optimization algorithm
 Methadone, "done" in slang

See also  
 Doan (disambiguation)
 Don (disambiguation)
 Donne (disambiguation)
 Den (disambiguation)
 Dunn (disambiguation)
 Dunne (disambiguation)
 Doneness, a measure of the degree to which meat is cooked